Drifter Cirque is a cirque between Mount Schmidtman and Mount Naab at the northeast end of Eastwind Ridge in the Convoy Range of Victoria Land. Iceflow from Eastwind Ridge is insufficient to carry surficial moraine away into Fry Glacier and moraines lie in a tangled eddy. So named by the New Zealand Geographic Board which also considered the name Eddy Cirque.

References

Landforms of Victoria Land